Alaín Milián (born January 15, 1983) is an amateur Cuban Greco-Roman wrestler, who played for the men's welterweight category. He won two bronze medals for his division at the 2005 World Wrestling Championships in Budapest, Hungary, and at the 2007 Pan American Games in Rio de Janeiro, Brazil.

Milian represented Cuba at the 2008 Summer Olympics in Beijing, where he competed for the men's 66 kg class. He lost the qualifying match to France's Steeve Guénot, who was able to score five points in two straight periods, leaving Milian with a single point. Because his opponent advanced further into the final match, Milian offered another shot for the bronze medal by entering the repechage bouts. He defeated Hungary's Tamás Lőrincz in the first round, before losing out his next match to Belarus' Mikhail Siamionau, with a two-set technical score (1–1, 1–3) and a classification point score of 1–3.

References

External links
 
 NBC Olympics Profile
 

Cuban male sport wrestlers
1983 births
Living people
Olympic wrestlers of Cuba
Wrestlers at the 2007 Pan American Games
Wrestlers at the 2008 Summer Olympics
People from Ciego de Ávila
Pan American Games bronze medalists for Cuba
World Wrestling Championships medalists
Pan American Games medalists in wrestling
Medalists at the 2007 Pan American Games
20th-century Cuban people
21st-century Cuban people